Margunn Lindholm (born 16 April 1996) is a Faroese footballer who plays as a midfielder and has appeared for the Faroe Islands women's national team.

Club career
Lindholm started her career playing for the second division side B68/NSÍ.

She was an important player for EB/Streymur/Skála, being the club's topscorer in the 2015, 2016 and 2018 seasons. In the 2018 Faroese Cup Final she scored a famous free-kick wondergoal against HB to win the club's second consecutive cup title, with her team down to 10 players.

In 2020 she moved to NSÍ Runavík.

International career
Lindholm has been capped for the Faroese national team, being part of the team that won the 2016 Baltic Cup and appearing for the team during the 2015 and 2019 FIFA Women's World Cup qualifying cycles.

Honours

Club

EBS/Skála
1. deild kvinnur: 2017, 2018
Faroese Women's Cup: 2017, 2018

NSÍ Runavík
Faroese Women's Cup: 2021

National team
Women's Baltic Cup: 2016

Individual
Faroese Best Women's Player: 2018

References

External links
 
 
 

1996 births
Living people
Faroese women's footballers
Faroe Islands women's international footballers
Women's association football midfielders